The rudis rattail, Coryphaenoides rudis, is a fish of the family Macrouridae, found around the world in tropical and subtropical oceans, at depths between 600 and 2,300 m.  Its length is between 30 and 40 cm, although FishBase gives lengths of up to 1.1 m.

References

 Tony Ayling & Geoffrey Cox, Collins Guide to the Sea Fishes of New Zealand,  (William Collins Publishers Ltd, Auckland, New Zealand 1982) 

Macrouridae
Fish described in 1878
Taxa named by Albert Günther